USS Phoebe is a name used more than once by the U.S. Navy:

 , a coastal minesweeper commissioned at Tacoma, Washington, 2 May 1941.
 , a fleet minesweeper commissioned 29 April 1955.

United States Navy ship names